This is a list of people from the French city of Marseille.

Born in Marseille
NOTE: People in italics do not have an article in the English language Wikipedia; links are to the relevant article in French Wikipedia.

Actors and singers 
 Béatrice Altariba (18 June 1939) - actress
 Andrex (André Jaubert) (23 January 1907; d. Marseille, 10 July 1989) - singer
 Jacques Angelvin (5 August 1914; d. Cannes, 10 November 1978) - actor, TV host
 Edmond Ardisson (30 November 1904; d. Marseille, 30 November 1983) - actor
 Henri Arius (19 September 1897d. Marseille, 8 May 1962) - actor
 Ariane Ascaride (10 October 1954) - actress
 Junie Astor (21 December 1911; d. Sainte-Magnance, 22 August 1967) - actress
 Marguerite Baux (fl. 1870s–1880s) - opera singer
 Charles Blavette (24 June 1906; d. Suresnes, 21 November 1967) - actor
 Patrick Bosso (12 October 1962) - actor
 Bréols (12 August 1905; d. Allauch, 20 December 1988) - actor, singer
 Pierrette Bruno (22 August 1928) - actress
 Lucien Callamand (1 April 1888; d. Nice, 3 December 1968) - actor
 Sonia Carrere (31 March 1982) - pornographic actress
 Jean Castan (23 August 1917; d. La Penne-sur-Huveaune, 11 November 1990) - actor
 Philippe Caubère (21 September 1950) - actor
 Fernand Charpin (30 May 1887; d. Marseille, 7 November 1944) - actor
 Marcel Charvey (22 February 1916; d. Puteaux, 21 August 1995) - actor
 Andrée Clément (7 August 1918; d. Paris, 31 May 1954) - actress
 Jo Corbeau (Georges Ohanessian) (1 December 1946) - reggae singer
 Henri Crémieux (19 July 1896; d. Cassis, 10 May 1980) - actor
 Dazincourt (Joseph Albouis) (11 December 1747; d. Paris, 28 March 1809) - actor
 Édouard Delmont (5 December 1883; d. Cannes, 22 November 1955) - actor
 Doumel (Louis Alfred Doumet) (2 December 1889; d. Reillanne, 23 May 1954) - actor
 Louis Ducreux (22 September 1911; d. Neuilly, 19 December 1992) - actor, director
 Dugazon (Jean-Henry Gourgaud) (15 November 1746; d. Sandillon, 11 October 1809) - actor
 Fernandel (Fernand Contandin) (7 May 1903; d. Paris, 26 February 1971) - actor, singer
 Franck Fernandel (Franck Contandin) (10 December 1935, d. Marseille, 8 June 2011) - actor, singer, radio host
 Ginette Garcin (1928–2010) - actor
 Louis Jourdan (19 June 1921–2015) - actor
 Jean Le Poulain (12 September 1924; d. Paris, 1 March 1988) - actor, director
 Cora Madou (5 January 1891; d. Villefranche sur Mer, 26 February 1971) - singer
 Lucie Manvel (1 May 1863; d. Paris 17e, 3 November 1943) - comedy theatre actress
 Avy Marciano (1 November 1972) - actor, musician, composer, author, interpreter
 Milly Mathis (8 September 1901; d. Salon de Provence, 30 March 1965) actress
 Marcel Maupi (6 November 1881; d. Antibes, 10 January 1949) - actor
 Clara Morgane (25 January 1981) - singer, former pornographic actress, media personality and TV host
 Paul Ollivier (10 February 1876; d. Paris, 10 June 1948) - actor
 Géraldine Pailhas (8 January 1971) - actress
 Paul Préboist (21 February 1927; d. Paris, 13 March 1997) - actor
 Joseph Pujol (1 June 1865; d. Toulon, 8 August 1945) - strolling comedian, professional farter
 Jean-Pierre Rambal (13 September 1931; d. Paris, 18 July 2001) - actor
 Marcelle Ranson-Hervé (10 October 1929) - actress
 Rellys (Henri Bourelly) (15 December 1905; d. Marseille, 20 July 1991) - actor
 Ishay Ribo (born 3 February 1989), Israeli singer-songwriter
 Jean Roucas (1 February 1952) - humourist
 Catherine Rouvel (31 August 1939) - actress
 Daniel Russo (13 May 1948) - actor, double
 Gabriel Signoret (15 November 1878; d. Paris, 16 March 1937) - actor
 Simone Simon (23 April 1911; d. Paris, 23 February 2005) - actress

Architects 
 Pascal Coste (26 November 1787; d. Marseille, 8 February 1879) - architect
 Paul Dupré-Lafon (17 June 1900; d. Deauville, December 1971) - architect and decorator
 Marcel Dourgnon (1858; d. Marseille, 1911) - architect
 Pierre Puget (16 October 1620; d. Marseille, 2 December 1694) - painter, sculptor, architect
 Albert-Félix-Théophile Thomas (1847; d. Paris, 1907) - architect

Dancers 
 Marie Allard (14 August 1742; d. Paris, 14 June 1802) - dancer
 Georges Appaix (1953) - dancer, choreographer
 Gaby Deslys (4 November 1881; d. Paris, 11 February 1920) - dancer, singer
 Maurice Béjart (1 January 1927; d. Lausanne, 22 November 2007) - dancer, choreographer
 Mathieu Ganio (1984) - dancer
 Daniel Larrieu (1927) - dancer
 Lucien Petipa (22 December 1815; d. Versailles, 7 July 1898) - dancer
 Marius Petipa (11 March 1818; d. Hourzouf (Crimea), 14 July 1910) - dancer, ballet master

Designers and poster artists 

 Georges Arditi (1914; d. 15 January 2012) - painter
 Jo Berto (Joseph Bertocchio) (22 November 1907; d. Marseille, 25 June 1978) - lithographic artist
 Honoré Daumier (26 February 1808; d. Valmondois, 11 February 1879) - caricaturist, sculptor
 Dubout (15 May 1905; d. Saint-Aunès, 27 June 1976) - humorous designer
 Gérard Lauzier (30 November 1932; d. 6 December 2008) - comic strip artist, film director
 Lisa Mandel (23 April 1977) - comic strip designer
 Tibet (31 October 1931; d. Roquebrune-sur-Argens, 3 January 2010) - comic strip designer
 Jean-Emmanuel Vermot-Desroches (1974) - comic strips

Directors 
 René Allio (8 March 1924; d. Paris, 27 March 1995) - painter, then scenario writer, film and theatre director
 André Benedetto (14 July 1934; d. Avignon, 13 July 2009) - author and theatre director, founder of « off » at Festival d'Avignon
 Paul Carpita (12 November 1922; d. Marseille, 23 October 2009) - scenario writer
 Philippe Dajoux (23 March 1968) - director
 Robert Guédiguian (3 December 1953) - director, actor, screenwriter and producer

Doctors 
 Charles Peyssonnel (1640; d. Marseille, 16 September 1720) - doctor, died from plague
 Jean-André Peyssonnel (19 June 1694; d. Guadeloupe, 24 December 1759) - doctor and naturalist

Editors 
 Robert Laffont (30 November 1916; d. Neuilly-sur-Seine, 19 May 2010) - editor
 Ferdinand Lop (10 October 1891; d. Saint-Sébastien-de-Morsent, 29 October 1974) - editor, poet

Engravers 
 Jacques Gautier d'Agoty (1710; d. Paris, 1781) - engraver
 Henri Berengier (1880; d. 1943) - engraver

Explorers 
 Euthymenes (5th century BC)
Pierre Blancard (1741-1826), introduced the chrysanthemum to France 
 Alphonse Fondère (26 August 1865; d. Addis-Abeba, 26 November 1930) - explorer, aviator
 Pytheas (4th century BC) - astronomer, explorer
 Gaston Rébuffat (7 May 1921; d. Paris, 31 May 1985) - Alpinist
 Jean-Noël Savelli (26 March 1853; d. Foumban, 14 November 1917) - soldier and explorer

Historians 
 Édouard Baratier (19 August 1923; d. Marseille, 31 July 1972) - historian
 Louis Blancard (1831–1902) - archivist, paleographer 
 Augustin Fabre (20 June 1797; d. Marseille, 16 January 1870) - historian
 Marc Fumaroli (10 June 1932–24 June 2020) - historian, essayist
 Jean-Baptiste Grosson (20 August 1733; d. Montefusco, 20 December 1800) - notary, historian of Marseille
 Camille Jullian (15 March 1859; d. Paris, 12 December 1933) - historian of Gaul

Industrialists and business people 
 Pierre Bellon (24 January 1930) - founder of Sodexo group
 Jules Charles-Roux (14 November 1841; d.|Paris, 6 March 1918) - industrialist, writer, patron
 Norbert D'Agostino - former president of Olympique de Marseille
 Jacques-Antoine Granjon (9 August 1962) - founder of online commerce site Vente-privee.com
 Jean Peyrelevade (24 October 1939) - businessman, politician
 Dominique Piazza (31 May 1860; d. Marseille, |10 December 1941) - inventor of the postcard
 Denis Ranque (7 January 1952) - former CEO and chairman of Thales Group
 Paul Ricard (9 July 1909; d.|Marseille, 7 November 1997) - founder of the Pernod-Ricard alcohol group 
 Marc Simoncini (1963) - founder of Internet dating site Meetic
 Serge Tchuruk (13 November 1937) - former CEO and chairman of Alcatel

Journalists 
 Jean-Pierre Foucault (23 November 1947) - radio and TV host
 Patrice Laffont (21 August 1940) - TV host
 André Remacle (3 April 1910; d. Marseille, 14 July 1995) - journalist, writer
 Jean-François Revel (19 January 1924; d. Paris, 30 April 2006) - philosopher, académicien, journalist, political chronicler and writer

Lawyers and judges
 Gilbert Collard (3 February 1948) - lawyer
 Paul Lombard (17 February 1917) - lawyer and writer
 Eugène Mouton (13 April 1823; d. Paris, 8 June 1902) - magistrate and writer
 Emile Pollak (21 April 1914; d. Marseille, 6 January 1978) - lawyer

Mafia 
 Francis le Belge (3 March 1946; d. Paris, 22 July 2000)
 François Spirito (1900; d. |Toulon, 9 October 1967)
 Nick Venturi (24 June 1923; d. Marseille, 6 April 2008)
 Tany Zampa (1 April 1933; d. Marseille, 16 August 1984)

Military people 
 François Joseph Marie Clary (3 October 1786; d. Paris, 27 January 1841) - brigadier
 François Coli (5 June 1881; d. North Atlantic, 8 May 1927) - aviator
 Guillaume Cornut (c. 1230; d. off Malta, 8 June or 8 July 1283) - admiral
 Pierre Dominique Garnier (19 December 1756; d. Nantes, 11 May 1827) - general in the French Revolution
 Jean Gaspard de Vence (6 April 1747; d. |Tonnerre, March 1808) - corsair, rear-admiral, maritime prefect of Toulon
 Joseph Maugard (24 December 1913; d. Montségur-sur-Lauzon, 11 September 1995) - Compagnon de la Libération
 Émile Muselier (10 April 1882; d. Toulon, 2 September 1965) - admiral
 Nicolas Roze (Le Chevalier Roze) (25 September 1675; d. Marseille, 2 September 1733) - captain during the 1720 plague
 Jean-Paul de Saumeur (Le Chevalier Paul) (December 1598; d. Toulon, 20 December 1667) - squadron commander

Musicians 
 Akhenaton (Philippe Fragione) (17 September 1968) - rapper
 Shurik'n (Geoffroy Mussard) (11 March 1966) - rapper
 Georges Arvanitas (13 June 1931; d. 25 July 2005) - pianist
 Roberto Benzi (12 December 1937) - orchestra conductor
 Erick Benzi (1 March 1959) - author, composer, director
 Ralph Bernet (1927) - lyric writer
 Georges Boeuf (1937) - composer
 Charles Burles (21 June 1936) - tenor
 Léo Chauliac (6 February 1913; d. 27 October 1977) - pianist, composer, orchestra conductor
 Stanislas Champein (19 November 1753; d. Paris, 19 September 1830) - composer
 Georges Chelon (4 January 1943) - author, composer, interpreter
 Régine Crespin (23 February 1927; d. Paris, 5 July 2007) - opera singer
 Domenico Della-Maria (14 June 1769; d. Paris, 9 March 1800) - opera composer
 Patrick Fiori (23 September 1969) - singer
 Mireille Flour (29 April 1906 – 1984) - classical harpist
 Zino Francescatti (9 August 1902; d. La Ciotat, 17 September 1991) - violinist
 Cedric Gervais (1979) - DJ and producer of house music
 Hubert Giraud (1920; d. 2016) - lyric writer
 André Jaume (7 October 1940) - saxophonist, clarinettist
 Maxence Larrieu (27 October 1934) - classical flautist
 Le Rat Luciano (Christophe Carmona) (21 April 1976) - rapper
 Jean Lumière (20 August 1895; d. Paris, 2 April 1979) - singer
 Paul Mauriat (|4 March 1925; d. Perpignan, 3 November 2006) - orchestra conductor
 Clara Morgane (1 January 1981) - porn actress
 Lucien Muratore (29 August 1876; d. Paris, 16 July 1954) - tenor, film actor
 André Pascal (1932; d. 2001) - songwriter
 Mireille Ponsard (1908; d. Paris, 5 February 1999) - singer, actress
 Franck Pourcel (14 August 1913; d. Neuilly sur Seine, 12 November 2000) - violinist, orchestra conductor
 Jean-Pierre Rampal (7 January 1922; d. Paris, 20 May 2000) - flautist
 Jean Marie Rebischung (30 March 1962) - composer
 Ernest Reyer (1 December 1823; d. Lavandou, 15 January 1909) - composer
 Jean-Michel Sanchez (28 June 1969) - organist, musicologist
 Vincent Scotto (21 April 1876; d. Paris, 15 November 1952) - composer
 SCH (real name Julien Schwarzer) (6 April 1993) - rapper 
 Cyril Tarquiny (24 May 1974) - guitarist
 Henri Tomasi (17 August 1901; d. Paris, 13 January 1971) - orchestra conductor
 Jannick Top (4 October 1947) - composer
 Cora Vaucaire (22 July 1918; d. Paris, 17 September 2011) - singer
 Raymond Vincy (23 February 1904; d. Neuilly-sur-seine, 26 May 1968) - lyric writer

Painters 
 Marguerite Allar (1 August 1899; d. Marseille, 22 January 1974) - painter and teacher
 Raymond Allègre (1857; d. Marseille, 1933) - painter
 Jean Arène (11 September 1929) - painter
 Marcel Arnaud (8 October 1877; d. Aix-en-Provence, 18 March 1956) - painter, director of the école des beaux-arts d'Aix-en-Provence
 Edmond Astruc (4 November 1878; d. Marseille (11 January 1977) - aviator and painter
 Louis Audibert (11 June 1880; d. Marseille, 20 March 1983) - painter
 Joseph-Marius Avy (21 September 1871; d. 1939) - painter
 Eugène de Barberiis (9 March 1851; d. Sanary, 29 November 1937) - painter
 Jean-Jérôme Baugean (18 June 1764; d. 1830) - painter and engraver
 Charles Camoin (23 September 1879; d. Paris, 29 May 1965) - painter
 Jacques Carelman (1929) - painter, decorator and illustrator
 Alfred Casile (9 February 1848; d. Marseille, 1 June 1909) - painter
 Alfred Chataud (17 August 1833; d. Alger, 1908) - Orientalist painter
 Jean-Antoine Constantin (20 January 1756; d. Aix-en-Provence, 9 January 1844) - painter
 Meiffren Conte (1624; d. Marseille, 10 March 1705) - painter
 Édouard Crémieux (21 January 1856; d. in deportation, May 1944) - painter
 Jean-Joseph Dassy (27 December 1791; d. Marseille, 27 July 1865) - painter
 Sauveur Marius Di Russo (11 January 1897; d. Marseille, 18 November 1983) - painter
 Eugène Dufour (1873; d. Marseille, 1941) - painter
 Antoine Ferrari (1 February 1910; d. Marseille, 1995) - painter
 Joseph Garibaldi (1863; d. Marseille, 7 May 1941) - painter
 François Gautier (1842; d. 1917) - painter
 Antoine Gianelli (23 August 1896; d. Marseille, 23 March 1983) - painter
 Jean-Amédée Gibert (28 January 1869; d. Marseille, 1945) - painter (Prix de Rome 1898), architect, curator of the Musées de Marseille
 Marius Guindon (8 April 1805; d. 1918) - painter, sculptor
 Piotr Klemensiewicz (11 February 1956) - painter
 Charles François Lacroix de Marseille (1700; d. Berlin, 1782) - painter
 Alfred Lombard (24 April 1884; d. Toulon, 7 September 1973) - painter
 Antoine Dominique Magaud (4 August 1817; d. Marseille, 23 December 1899) - painter
 Étienne Philippe Martin (27 July 1856; d. Marseille, 6 March 1945) - painter, musician
 Jules Monge (1855; d. Paris, 1934) - painter
 Adolphe Monticelli (18 October 1824; d. Marseille, 26 June 1886) - painter
 Alphonse Moutte (4 March 1840; d. Marseille, 21 April 1913) - painter
 Louis Nattero (16 October 1870; d. Marseille, 10 November 1915) - painter
 Jean-Baptiste Olive (31 July 1848; d. Paris, 13 May 1936) - painter
 Henri Pinta (1856; d. Paris, 1944) - painter, Prix de Rome 1884 
 Jean-Claude Quilici (1941) - painter
 Marie Rauzy (21 March 1961) - painter
 Marius Rey (1836; d. 1927) - painter
 Gustave Ricard (1 September 1823; d. Paris, 23 January 1873) - painter
 Antoine Roux (6 March 1765; d. Marseille, 20 April 1835) - painter
 Arsène Sari (7 October 1895; d. Aubagne, 8 November 1995) - painter
 René Seyssaud (15 June 1867; d. Saint-Chamas, 24 Septembre) - painter
 Louis Toncini (1907; d. 2002) - painter
 François Topino-Lebrun (11 April 1764; d. Paris, 31 January 1801) - painter and revolutionary
 Stanislas Torrents (23 May 1839; d. Cannes, 6 November 1916) - painter
 Louis Trabuc (2 August 1928; d. Manosque, 23 February 2008) - painter
 André Alexandre Verdilhan (14 March 1881; d. Paris, 21 July 1963) - painter, sculptor
 Fortuné Viguier (1841; d. 1916) - painter
 Auguste Vimar (3 November 1851; d. Marseille, 23 August 1916) - painter, sculptor

Police officers 
 Lucien Aimé-Blanc (23 March 1935–19 February 2020) - Commissioner
 Gérard Girel (7 August 1946) - Commissioner
 Georges Nguyen Van Loc (2 April 1933; d. Cannes, 7 December 2008) - Commissioner, writer and actor

Politicians 
 René Arthaud (21 September 1915; d. 21 July 2007) - Deputy
 Charles Barbaroux (6 March 1767; d. Bordeaux, 25 June 1794) - lawyer, Deputy
 Henry Bergasse (26 September 1894; d. Marseille, 28 March 1977) - Deputy
 Paul Boulet (8 September 1894; d. Montpellier, 27 July 1982) - Deputy
 Charles de Casaulx (20 March 1547; d. Marseille, 17 February 1596) - Premier Consul
 Jean Chevallier (31 July 1897; d. Saumur, 14 November 1985) - Vichy French governor of Sigmaringen (1945-1949)
 Désirée Clary (8 November 1777; d. Stockholm, 17 December 1860) - Queen of Sweden
 François Clary (24 February 1725; d. Marseille, 20 January 1794) - Alderman of Marseille
 Joseph Nicolas Clary (26 March 1760; d. Paris, 6 June 1823) - Pair des Cent-Jours
 Augustin-Eudes-Joseph Durand (7 May 1757) - Deputy
 Jean-Baptiste Estelle (January 1662; d. Marseille, January 1723) - Alderman
 Étienne Garnier-Pagès (27 December 1801; d. Paris, 23 June 1841) - Deputy
 Jean-Claude Gaudin (8 October 1939) - Senator, Mayor
 François Girard (23 July 1761; d. Paris, 26 March 1854) - Deputy for Vaucluse
 François Omer Granet (16 November 1758; d. 10 September 1821) - Deputy
 François Isoard (3 March 1765; d. Aix-en-Provence, 25 September 1795) - secretary of the Club des amis de la Constitution 
 Alexandre Marius Jacob (27 September 1879; d. Bois-Saint-Denis (Indre), 28 August 1954) - anarchist
 Antoine de Jessé-Charleval (1836; d. Marseille, 1915) - Mayor of Marseille
 Henri Jibrayel (18 September 1951) - Deputy
 Jean-François Lieutaud (3 March 1754; d. Paris, 19 February 1801) - Commandant général of the garde nationale in Marseille
 Charles-Marie Livon (19 May 1850; d. Marseille, 16 August 1917) - doctor, Mayor of Marseille
 Joseph Mascarel (1816; d. Los Angeles, 1899) - sailor, Mayor of Los Angeles
 Jean-Raymond Mourraille (25 November 1721; d. Marseille, 30 December 1808) - astronomer, Mayor of Marseille
 Émile Ollivier (2 July 1825; d. Saint-Gervais les bains, 20 August 1913) - Minister
 Claude-Charles de Peyssonnel (1727; d. Paris, 1790) - Ambassador
 Paul Peytral (20 January 1842; d. Marseille, 30 November 1919) - Deputy, minister
 Victor Peytral (18 October 1874; d. Draguignan, 20 April 1964) - Deputy, minister
 Michel Pezet (9 April 1942) - Deputy, lawyer
 Germaine Poinso-Chapuis (6 March 1901; d. Marseille, 20 February 1981) - Minister
 François-Trophime Rebecquy (1 September 1744; d. Marseille, 3 May 1794) - Deputy
 Henri Tasso (8 October 1882; d. Marseille, 12 February 1944) - Mayor of Marseille
 Adolphe Thiers (15 April 1797; d. Saint-Germain-en-Laye, 3 September 1877) - President of France
 Michel Vaxès (14 November 1940) - Deputy
 Raymond Valabrègue (25 September 1899; d. Marseille, 18 April 1966) - Deputy for Drôme

Religious personalities 
See also Roman Catholic Archdiocese of Marseille.

 Pierre Barthélemy (Peter Bartholomew) (d. Palestine, 20 April 1099) - soldier, mystic
 Louis-Toussaint Dassy (1 November 1808; d. Marseille, 23 August 1888) - abbot, founder of the institute for young blind
 Jean-Baptiste Fouque (12 September 1851; d. Marseille, 5 December 1926) - priest
 Folquet de Marselha (1155; d. Toulouse, 25 December 1231) - Bishop of Toulouse
 Jean-Pierre Ricard (25 September 1944) - Cardinal

Résistants 
 
 Berty Albrecht (15 February 1893; d. Fresnes, 1943) - résistante
 Marie-Madeleine Fourcade (8 November 1909; d. Paris, 20 July 1989) - Chief of the "Alliance" network
 Éliane Plewman (1917; d. Dachau, 13 September 1944) - résistante

Scientists 
 Elzéar Abeille de Perrin (3 January 1843; d. Marseille, 9 October 1910) - entomologist
 Sabin Berthelot (4 April 1794; d. 10 November 1880) - naturalist, ethnologist
 François Cauvière (13 October 1780; d.|Marseille, 2 October 1858) - surgeon
 Henri Fabre (29 November 1882; d. Le Touvet, 30 June 1984) - engineer, aviator
 Charles Fabry (11 June 1867; d. Paris, 11 December 1945) - physicist
 Max Escalon de Fonton (5 February 1920) - prehistorian, archaeologist
 Jean Baptiste Marie Jaubert (17 March 1726; d. Brignoles, 9 August 1884) - doctor and ornithologist
 Henry de Lumley (14 August 1934) - archeologist, geologist and prehistorian
 Frank Merle (22 November 1962) - mathematician
 Fernand Mossé (25 May 1892 – 10 July 1956) - philologist
 Jean-André Peyssonnel (19 June 1694; d. Saint-Bertrand de l'Isle Grande-Terre in Guadeloupe, 24 December 1759) - doctor and naturalist
 Guillaume de Saint-Jacques de Silvabelle (28 January 1722; d. Marseille, 10 February 1801) - mathematician, astronomer
 André Turcat (23 October 1921 – 4 January 2016) - test pilot, first pilot of Concorde at supersonic speed

Sculptors 
 César Baldaccini (1 January 1921; d. Paris, 6 December 1998) - sculptor
 Jean-Marie Baumel (2 November 1911; d. Neuilly (Eure), 2 June 1978) - sculptor
 Auguste Carli (12 July 1868; d. Paris, 28 January 1930) - sculptor
 Alice Colonieu (5 November 1924; d. Marseille, 16 July 2010) - sculptor, ceramicist, painter
 Paul Gondard (7 September 1884; d. Marseille, 27 February 1953) - sculptor
 Gustave Guétant (25 May 1873; d. Marseille, 23 July 1953) - sculptor, designer, illustrator
 Jean-Louis Lagnel (8 February 1764; d. Marseille, 16 September 1822) - santonnier
 Henri-Édouard Lombard (21 January 1875; d. Paris, 23 July 1929) - sculptor, Prix de Rome 1883
 Raymonde Martin (15 January 1887; d. Marseille, 7 December 1977) - sculptor
 Pierre Puget (16 October 1620; d. Marseille, 2 December 1694) - painter, sculptor, architect and engineer
 Raymond Servian (18 May 1903; d. Marseille, February 1953) - sculptor
 Élie-Jean Vézien (18 July 1890; d. Marseille, 7 September 1982) - sculptor, engraver and medallist

Sportsmen and women 
 Paul Aymé (29 July 1869; d. Madrid, |25 July 1962) - tennis player
 Élie Bayol (28 February 1914; d. La Ciotat, 25 May 1995) - motor racer
 Jean Boiteux (20 June 1933; d. Bordeaux, 11 April 2010) - swimmer
 Jean Bouin (21 December 1888; d. Xivray (Meuse), 29 September 1914) - long-distance runner
 Alexandre Caizergues (14 March 1979) - kite surfer
 Éric Cantona (24 May 1966) - footballer
 Daniel Costantini (21 October 1943) - handball trainer
 Rolland Courbis (12 August 1953) - footballer, trainer
 Antoine Delpero (1 November 1985) - longboard surfer
 Marcel Dib (10 August 1960) - footballer
 Albin Ebondo (23 February 1984) - footballer
 Jean-Luc Ettori (29 July 1955) - footballer
 Mathieu Flamini (7 March 1984) - footballer
 Wesley Tidjan Fofana (17 December 2000) - footballer
 Laurent Foirest (18 September 1973) - basketball player
 Jessica Fox (11 June 1994) - kayaker and canoeist
 Gustave Ganay (21 March 1892; d. Paris, 23 August 1926) - cyclist
 Gérard Gili (7 August 1952) - footballer
 Sébastien Grosjean (29 May 1978) - tennis player
 Lucas Hernandez (14 February 1996) - footballer
 Théo Hernandez (6 October 1997) - footballer
 Myriam Jérusalmi (24 October 1961) - kayaker
 Frank Lebœuf (22 January 1968) - footballer
 Peter Luccin (9 April 1979) - footballer
 Mohamed M'Changama (9 June 1987) - footballer
 William Meynard (11 July 1987) - swimmer
 Alain Mosconi (9 September 1949) - swimmer
 André Moulon (10 August 1935; d. Marseille, 14 April 2009) - footballer
 Anthony Muleta (31 January 1986) - rugby union player
 Samir Nasri (26 June 1987) - footballer
 Louisa Nécib (23 January 1987) - footballer
 Christopher Pratt (1981) - navigator and skipper
 Gaston Rébuffat (7 May 1921; d. Marseille, 1 June 1985) - Alpinist
 Julien Sablé (11 September 1980) - footballer
 Roger Scotti (29 July 1925; d. Marseille, 12 December 2001) - footballer
 Anthony Terras (21 June 1985) - shooting
 Alain Weisz (29 May 1953) - former basketball player, trainer
 Zinédine Zidane (23 June 1972) - footballer

Writers 
 Amédée Achard (22 April 1814; d. Paris, 26 March 1875) - writer, journalist
 Antonin Artaud (4 September 1896; d. Ivry-sur-Seine, 4 March 1948) - writer, poet
 Gilles Ascaride (1947) - writer, sociologist
 Gabriel Audisio (27 July 1910; d. Issy-les-Moulineaux, 26 January 1978) - writer, poet
 Joseph Autran (20 June 1813; d. Marseille, 6 March 1877) - dramatist, poet
 Nicolas Thomas Barthe (1734; d. 17 June 1785) - dramatist, poet
 Auguste-Marseille Barthélemy (11 May 1794; d. Marseille, 23 August 1867) - poet
 Jean-François de Bastide (15 July 1724; d. Milan, 4 July 1798) - polygraph
 Jean-Michel Billioud (1964) - writer
 Maria Borrély (16 October 1890; d. Digne-les-Bains, 22 February 1963) - writer
 Louis Brauquier (14 August 1900; d. Marseille, 7 September 1976) - writer, poet
 Robert Bouvier (21 July 1941; d. Marseille, 11 May 1992) - journalist, writer
 Marcel Brion (21 November 1895; d. Paris, 23 October 1984) - writer, art historian, Académicien
 Antoine Bruguière de Sorsum (22 June 1773; d. Marseille, 7 October 1823) - philologist
 Philippe Carrese (6 April 1956) - writer, documentary maker
 Patrick Cauvin (6 October 1932; d. Paris, 13 August 2010) - writer
 Jean de La Ceppède (1548; d. Avignon, 1623) - poet, magistrate
 Jean Contrucci (7 June 1939) - writer
 Gilles Del Pappas (14 December 1949) - writer
 César Chesneau Dumarsais (17 July 1676; d. Paris, 11 June 1756) - philosopher, grammarian
 Jean-Christophe Duchon-Doris (2 January 1960) - writer
 Paul Alexandre Dulard (8 March 1695; d. Marseille, 7 December 1760) - poet
 Yann de L'Écotais (14 November 1940; d. Paris, 23 October 2008) - writer, journalist
 René Frégni (8 July 1947) - writer
 Christian Garcin (8 November 1959) - writer
 Victor Gélu (12 September 1806; d. Marseille, 2 April 1885) - poet in Provençal language, Marseilles dialect
 Daniel Giraud (10 January 1946) - writer and translator from Chinese, blues musician
 Léon Gozlan (11 September 1803; d. Paris, 14 September 1866) - writer, associated with Balzac
 Jean-Claude Izzo (20 June 1945; d. Marseille, 26 January 2000) - writer

 Edmond Jaloux (19 June 1878; d. Lutry, 15 August 1949) - novelist, literary critic 
 Sébastien Japrisot (4 July 1931; d. Vichy, 4 March 2003) - novelist, screenwriter
 Étienne-François de Lantier (1734–1826) - playwright
 Jean-Patrick Manchette (19 December 1942; d. Paris, 3 June 1995) - writer and chronicler
 Joseph Méry (21 January 1797; d. Paris, 20 June 1866) - polygraph
 Thyde Monnier (Mathilde Anna Rose) (23 June 1887; d. Nice, 18 January 1967) - writer
 Marc-Édouard Nabe (27 December 1958) - writer, painter
 Florence Pazzottu (9 November 1962) - poet
 Michel Ragon (24 June 1924) - writer
 Charles Rinn (1849–1929) - hellenist, lexicographer
 Edmond Rostand (1 April 1868; d. Paris, 2 December 1918) - dramatic author, Académie française
 André Roussin (22 January 1911; d. Paris, 3 November 1987) - writer of comedies
 Saint-Pol-Roux (15 January 1861; d. Brest, 18 October 1940) - poet
 Eugène Saccomano (23 September 1936) - journalist, writer
 Serge Scotto (15 November 1963) - writer
 Christiane Singer (1943; d. Vienna, 4 April 2007) - writer, essayist and novelist
 André Suarès (12 June 1868; d. Saint-Maur, 7 September 1948) - writer
 Honoré d'Urfé (11 February 1568; d. Villefranche-sur-mer, 1 June 1625) - novelist
 Frédéric Valabrègue (12 January 1952) - novelist
 Jean-Marc Valladier (1957) - writer

Associated with Marseille
Marseille was the place of birth, death or residence of:
 Larry Azouni (born 1994) - football player
 Romain Barnier (born 1976) - freestyle swimmer
 Jean-Claude Beton (1925–2013) - founder of Orangina
 Isabelle Caro (1982–2010) - model and actress
 Georges Chappe (born 1944) - cyclist
 Pierre Demours (1702–1795) - physician
 Robert Digonnet (8 November 1900; d. Marseille, 28 January 1991) - PDG of the Société du Thé de l'Éléphant
 Jean-Baptiste Benoît Eyriès (1767–1846) - geographer, author and translator
 Augustin Féraud (d. Marseille) - founder of BTP group, GTM, ex-Vinci
 Philippe Gaillet (1924) - painter
 Rémy Di Gregorio (born 1985) - cyclist
 Henri-Irénée Marrou (1904–1977) - historian
 Charles-Joseph-Eugene de Mazenod (1782–1861) - bishop of Marseille and founder of the Missionary Oblates of Mary Immaculate
 Pavlos Melas (1870–1904) - Greek army officer
 Darius Milhaud (1892–1974) - composer
 Marc Panther (born 1970) - member of the Japanese rock band Globe
 Jonathan Santiago (born 1994) - football player
 Sacha Sosno (born 1937–2013) - sculptor

References

 
Marseille
People